USS Coco (SP-110) was an armed motorboat that served in the United States Navy as a Section patrol vessel from 1917 to 1919.

Coco was built in 1917 by the Albany Boat Corporation at Watervliet, New York for William John Matheson of New York and Coconut Grove, Florida. The U.S. Navy purchased Coco from her owner for $5,500 on 23 June 1917 for use as a section patrol boat during World War I. She was commissioned on 23 July 1917 as USS Coco (SP-110) armed with one machine gun.

Assigned to the Section patrol in the 7th Naval District, Coco served in Florida waters for the rest of the war and for some months after the fighting ended.  Coco was one three of Matheson's yachts in government service, the others being Marpessa and Calabash. Coco was stricken from the Naval Vessel Register on 23 June 1919.

The motorboat was sold on 5 August. Before she could be delivered to her new owner, M. C. Carmichael, she was among several patrol boats wrecked in the 1919 Florida Keys hurricane on 9–10 September while anchored in North Beach Basin at Key West, Florida.

Footnotes

References

External links
NavSource Online: Section Patrol Craft Photo Archive: Coco (SP 110)

Patrol vessels of the United States Navy
World War I patrol vessels of the United States
Ships built in New York (state)
1917 ships
Shipwrecks of the Florida Keys
Maritime incidents in 1919